The episcopal see centred on the town of Forum Traiani (today Fordongianus in Sardinia) is now a titular see of the Catholic Church.

The Latin adjective used in relation to the see is Foritraianensis.

The first titular bishop of the see was appointed on 18 May 1968.

References

Forum Traiani